was a village located in Kitagunma District, Gunma Prefecture, Japan.

As of 2003, the village had an estimated population of 11,937 and a density of 291.36 persons per km². The total area was 40.97 km².

On February 20, 2006, Komochi, along with the town of Ikaho, the village of Onogami (all from Kitagunma District), and the villages of Akagi and Kitatachibana (both from Seta District), was merged into the expanded city of Shibukawa.

External links
Shibukawa official website 

Dissolved municipalities of Gunma Prefecture
Shibukawa, Gunma